La Cueva is an unincorporated community in Santa Fe County, New Mexico, United States.

Education
La Cueva's education falls under the Santa Fe Public Schools system. Zoned to El Dorado Community School (K-8) in El Dorado. Its high school is Santa Fe High School.

References

Unincorporated communities in Santa Fe County, New Mexico
Unincorporated communities in New Mexico